Paul McKeever may refer to:
 Paul McKeever (politician), leader of the Freedom Party of Ontario
 Paul McKeever (police officer), British police officer